Hypocryphalus mangiferae, known generally as the mango bark beetle or shoot gun perforator, is a species of typical bark beetle in the family Curculionidae.

References

Further reading

 
 

Scolytinae
Articles created by Qbugbot
Beetles described in 1914